Aalborg Teater is the main theatre in Aalborg, Denmark. Built in 1878, it was subsequently modified by Julius Petersen and was remodeled in 2000. Its address is still Jernbanegade (Railway Street), although the station and the theatre have both moved. The theatre has three stages and seats 870 in the main auditorium. There are 10-12 annual productions with a total of 250-400 performances, covering a wide selection of drama and musicals.
Originally privately owned, it is now controlled and owned by the Danish Ministry of Culture. While most productions are housed in the main hall, the building can accommodate up to four shows in its other halls.

History
When the railway reached Aalborg at the end of the 1860s, the newly constructed Jernbanegade (Railway Street) provided an ideal site for Grøntved, the local butcher, to build a theatre. Completed in 1878, initially it could accommodate audiences of almost 1,110 as there were many cheap standing places. Julius Petersen, one of the leading directors in the provinces, bought the theatre in 1882 and shortly afterwards married Grøntved's daughter, Anne, who played a leading role in the theatre's development.

Petersen undertook major modifications to the building, providing seating for 500 in the stalls and 370 on the balcony. The stage was extended and more powerful gas lighting was installed (to be replaced in 1921 by electric light). In 1914, on his 70th birthday, Petersen transferred ownership of the theatre to the city, receiving an allowance and a box seat in return. Under the city's administration, a number of directors were appointed in fairly rapid succession, as they all experienced difficulties in making ends meet. In 1937, Jakob Nielsen from Frederiksberg's Betty Nansen Teatret took over and appointed a new company of actors. Despite limited budgets, he was able to present 15 productions in the first season, acting in 14 of them himself. During the Second World War, the Germans commandeered the theatre as a cinema for their troops but it was reopened in September 1945. Over the years the theatre has been run by the municipality or the region but it is now one of four theatres in the hands of the Danish Ministry of Culture, the others being Odense Teater, Aarhus Teater and the Royal Danish Theatre in Copenhagen.

Directors

References

External links
 Official website 

Buildings and structures in Aalborg
Theatres in Denmark
Theatres completed in 1878